Rolf Johannessen (15 March 1910 – 2 February 1965) was a Norwegian football defender.

Career
He played for Norway in the 1938 FIFA World Cup. He was capped 20 times for Norway.

At club level, he played for Lisleby, then Fredrikstad from 1934. He also played football while taking education in Saarland, and became Saar champion. In Norway he won two league titles and four cup titles.

After retiring he chaired Fredrikstad FK from 1950 to 1953 and 1960 to 1962. He was an honorary member of the club. He died in February 1965 at Fredrikstad Hospital.

Fifa World Cup career

References

1910 births
1965 deaths
Sportspeople from Fredrikstad
Norwegian expatriates in Germany
Norwegian footballers
Norway international footballers
Fredrikstad FK players
1938 FIFA World Cup players
Norwegian sports executives and administrators
Lisleby FK players
Association football defenders